RETN may refer to:

RETN (ISP), a Tier 2 ISP in Europe headquartered in London
Resistin, a protein encoded by RETN gene.